Mirjam van Praag (Schiedam, 11 November 1967) is a Dutch econometrician. She is the President of the Vrije Universiteit Amsterdam.

Van Praag was elected a member of the Royal Netherlands Academy of Arts and Sciences in 2020.

Biography 
Mirjam van Praag is the younger daughter of the econometrician Bernard van Praag (born 1939) and Loes van Weezel (born 1940). Both of her parents are of Jewish descent and went into hiding to avoid capture by the Nazis and their collaborators. She grew up with her older sister (born 1964) near Rotterdam.

References 

1967 births
Living people
21st-century  Dutch economists
20th-century  Dutch economists
Dutch people of Jewish descent
Dutch women economists
Econometricians
Women statisticians
Members of the Royal Netherlands Academy of Arts and Sciences
Academic staff of Vrije Universiteit Amsterdam
Women heads of universities and colleges